The Pardee Home is a house in Oakland, California. It was the home of three generations of the Pardee family. It is now a non-profit museum showing over 100 years of the life of a prominent California family. The house, a well-preserved example of Italianate architecture, is a city landmark, a California Historical Landmark, and listed on the National Register of Historic Places.

The house was constructed in 1868 by California State Senator Enoch H. Pardee. His son, George Pardee, a Governor of California, also inhabited the house, inheriting it after his father's death. After George's death in 1941, it passed on to his two daughters, Madeline and Helen (the same name as her mother), who lived in the house until their deaths in 1980 and 1981 respectively.

The interior of the house is the main attraction of the museum. George's wife Helen collected knick-knacks from all over the world, including scrimshaw from Alaska, tobacco pipes from the Philippines, and a giant elk head. She was fond of giving house tours to show off her collection. All of the furnishings are original and the house looks as it did in 1981.

The original carriage house and stable are still standing and the entire complex is part of Oakland's Preservation Park Historic District. The house was to be demolished for the construction of Interstate 980, but conservationists were able to save the building. It opened as a public museum in 1991.

References

External links

Pardee Home web site
Preservation Park web site
Historic American Buildings Survey. Photographs, October 1960. Description and history, January 1966

Houses in Oakland, California
California Historical Landmarks
History of Oakland, California
Houses on the National Register of Historic Places in California
National Register of Historic Places in Oakland, California
Italianate architecture in California
Victorian architecture in California
Houses completed in 1869
Museums in Oakland, California
Historic house museums in California
Houses in Alameda County, California
1869 establishments in California